Rokiciny  is a village in Tomaszów Mazowiecki County, Łódź Voivodeship, in central Poland. It is the seat of the gmina (administrative district) called Gmina Rokiciny.

References

Villages in Tomaszów Mazowiecki County